The Passionate Thief is a 1960 Italian comedy film directed by Mario Monicelli, starring Anna Magnani and Totò.

Plot
Two friends (Toto and Magnani) live by their wits working as comedians and cabaret at Cinecittà, before being invited to friends' parties or masked balls during New Year's Eve in Rome. The two, however, even though they make people laugh all the time in public, live an inner conflict, namely that the two have always to be aware to give a smile to someone, but they can never be rich and happy because they are street artists and with a precarious wage.

Cast
 Anna Magnani as Gioia Fabbricotti (alias Tortorella)
 Totò as Umberto "Infortunio" Pennazzuto
 Ben Gazzara as Lello
 Fred Clark as The American
 Edy Vessel as The girl
 Gina Rovere as Mimi
 Toni Ucci as L'amico de Milena

References

External links
 
 
 
 
 

1960 films
1960 comedy films
Films based on works by Alberto Moravia
Films directed by Mario Monicelli
Italian comedy films
1960s Italian-language films
Films with screenplays by Suso Cecchi d'Amico
Films with screenplays by Age & Scarpelli
Films set in Rome
Films shot in Rome
1960s Italian films